Vlieger can refer to:

 Vlieger (cape), an article of clothing
 Vlieger, North West, a South African village